is the 17th single by Japanese singer/songwriter Chisato Moritaka. The lyrics were written by Moritaka and the music was composed by Hideo Saitō. The single was released alongside  by Warner Music Japan on January 25, 1993. The song was used as the theme song to the TX variety show Ii Tabi: Yume Kibun.

Background
"Watarasebashi" is composed in the key of C major and set to a tempo of 77 beats per minute. Moritaka's vocals span from B3 to C5. Lyrically, the song tells the story of a woman reminiscing on a past love at the sight of a sunset. When writing the song, Moritaka scanned maps of Japan in search of bridges or rivers with a "beautiful" sounding name and found the Watarase River. When she learned of the existence of the Watarase Bridge in Ashikaga, Tochigi, a city she had once visited while touring, she decided to base the lyrics on the area.

Music video 
The music video for "Watarasebashi" pays homage to The Beatles's "Let It Be" and features Moritaka performing the song on piano, playing the drums as well as performing the recorder solo.

Chart performance 
"Watarasebashi" debuted at No. 9 on the Oricon Singles Chart with 72,000 units sold in the first week. It fell out of the top twenty two weeks later, but came back the next week at number 20 before dropping off again. The single charted in the top 100 for fifteen weeks, selling a reported total of 310,000 copies during its run. "Watarasebashi" ranked at number 96 on the year-end chart.

Other versions 
On November 25, 2009, Moritaka released a newly recorded version of the song as a double A-side single with "Ame".

Other media 
"Watarasebashi" was released as an interactive CD-ROM by Oracion on December 20, 1995. The CD-ROM features the music video, interviews with Moritaka, VR photos of Ashikaga and five extra music videos. It was re-released in the two-disc set Watarasebashi/La La Sunshine for the Sega Saturn on September 11, 1997.

The song was included in the 2020 various artists album .

Legacy 
In 2007, a stele was erected in Ashikaga in honor of Moritaka's contributions to the city. The stele features a speaker that plays a portion of the song. Since being mentioned in the song, the Yagumo Shrine (八雲神社) has become a popular sightseeing spot. When the shrine burned down in a fire in December 2012, Moritaka raised funds to support its reconstruction, which was completed in late 2017.

Track listing 
All lyrics are written by Chisato Moritaka; all music is composed and arranged by Hideo Saitō.

1993 single

2017 Blu-ray Complete Box

Personnel 
 Chisato Moritaka – vocals, drums, piano, alto recorder
 Hideo Saitō – guitar, bass, tambourine, synthesizer

Charts

Certification

Aya Matsuura version

"Watarasebashi" was recorded by Hello! Project soloist and one-time Moritaka labelmate Aya Matsuura. It was released as a single by Zetima on October 20, 2004. The music video features Matsuura performing the song on a footbridge, with two schoolchildren playing recorders during the instrumental section.

Chart performance
Matsuura's version of "Watarasebashi" debuted at number 6 on the Oricon Singles Chart with 29,000 units sold, peaking higher than the original Moritaka version. Her version charted on the Oricon Singles Chart for six weeks, selling a reported total of 48,000 copies during its run.

Track listing

Charts

Sales

|-
! scope="row"| Japan (RIAJ)
| 
| 48,000
|-

Other cover versions
 Enka singer Sanae Jōnouchi included a cover of the song as B-side to her 1993 single "Yowasete yo Kon'ya Dake", which is also a cover of a Moritaka song.
 Gen Takayama recorded a cover of the song for his 1993 album Kokoro Kōrasete, his first album in eleven years.
 Chaka covered the song for her 1999 album I Found Love.
 Maomi Yuki covered the song for her 2003 EP Real My Heart.
 Maki Goto recorded her version of the song for her 2005 album 3rd Station.
 Kyogo Kawaguchi recorded a cover of the song for his 2007 cover album Kimi wo Suki Datta Ano Koro.
 ManaKana recorded a cover of the song for their third cover album Futari Uta 3 in 2010. 
 The Japanese music duo Kasarinchu covered the song, in collaboration with Shin Kōno, for the 2013 album Sū-chan Mai-chan Sawako-san. 
 Minami Kizuki recorded a cover of the song for her first cover album Sakuranagashi in 2015.

References

External links
  (Chisato Moritaka)
  (Warner Music Japan)
 
 

1993 songs
2004 singles
2009 singles
2017 video albums
Japanese-language songs
Chisato Moritaka songs
Aya Matsuura songs
Maki Goto songs
Songs with lyrics by Chisato Moritaka
Songs with music by Hideo Saitō (musician, born 1958)
Warner Music Japan singles
Zetima Records singles